Orient is a small unincorporated community in northeastern Ferry County, Washington, United States. The Kettle River flows to the east of the town and marks the border with Stevens County. A BNSF rail line runs through the town alongside U.S. Route 395.  The population at the 2010 census was 115.

History
Orient was the endpoint of a cable bucket tramway completed in 1892 that ran from the First Thought Mine. The First Thought Mine closed down in 1942.

Orient was first settled in 1900 by Alec Ireland and by George Temple in 1901.

Other mines, which were located in the area, Hidden Treasure mine, Red Lion mine, Copper butte mine, Globe mine, and Scotia mine.

Orient School
Orient is served by Orient School District No. 65. The district offers classes from kindergarten to grade 8. In October 2004, the district had an enrollment of 88 and a single school. The Orient School building is one of the oldest continuously used schoolhouses in Washington state. It was built in 1910.

References

Census-designated places in Ferry County, Washington
Census-designated places in Washington (state)
Populated places in the Okanagan Country